Maryland Route 58 (MD 58) is a state highway in the U.S. state of Maryland.  Known for most of its length as Cearfoss Pike, the state highway runs  from MD 63 in Cearfoss east to Key Circle in Hagerstown.  MD 58 was constructed in the late 1920s along what was originally a turnpike called the Hagerstown and Cross Roads Turnpike.

Route description

MD 58 begins at the Cearfoss Roundabout in Cearfoss, where the highway intersects MD 63 (Greencastle Pike) and the county-maintained portion of Cearfoss Pike, which heads northwest toward the borough of Mercersburg, Pennsylvania, becoming Pennsylvania Route 416 at the state line. MD 58 heads southeast as two-lane undivided Cearfoss Pike through farmland and scattered residences. Between Point Salem Road and Terps Boulevard, MD 58 expands to a four-lane divided highway and meets Interstate 81 (I-81, Maryland Veterans Memorial Highway) at a partial cloverleaf interchange. Within the interchange, the state highway enters the city of Hagerstown and its name changes to Salem Avenue. The road passes northeast of a park and ride lot past the interchange. East of I-81, MD 58 enters a densely populated residential area, reduces to a two-lane street, and reaches its eastern terminus at the intersection with Key Circle. Salem Avenue continues southeast as a municipal street toward downtown Hagerstown.

History
The predecessor highway of MD 58 was the 19th century Hagerstown and Cross Roads Turnpike, which followed essentially the same alignment as modern MD 58 between the tollgate at Broadfording Road, now just east of I-81, and Cearfoss.  What is now the county-maintained portion of Cearfoss Pike was originally the Mercersburg Road.  About  of that county highway from Cearfoss to Conococheague Creek was paved as a state-aid road in 1916 but was not taken into the state road system and was never part of MD 58.  MD 58 was paved from Broadfording Road to Garden View Road in 1928 and extended to Cearfoss in 1930.  The state highway was rebuilt starting in 1956; the highway was expanded at that time to a four-lane divided highway around its interchange with I-81, which was completed in 1958.  The Cearfoss Roundabout at the state highway's western terminus was constructed in 1995.

Junction list

See also

References

External links

MDRoads: MD 58

058
Maryland Route 058
Hagerstown